Gérard Charasse (born 26 March 1944 in Le Vernet, Allier) was a member of the National Assembly of France.  He represented Allier's 4th constituency (from 1997 to 2012).  Then major boundary changes in 2011 reduced Allier's parliamentary entitlement from 4 constituencies down to 3 - the old 3rd constituency was in effect abolished, its name and substantially its place being taken over by the pre-2012 4th constituency. Charasse then successfully took the 3rd constituency (from 2012 to 2017). He was a member of the Radical Party of the Left; he lost his seat in the 2017 Parliamentary Elections.

References

1944 births
Living people
People from Allier
Politicians from Auvergne-Rhône-Alpes
Radical Party of the Left politicians
Deputies of the 11th National Assembly of the French Fifth Republic
Deputies of the 12th National Assembly of the French Fifth Republic
Deputies of the 13th National Assembly of the French Fifth Republic
Deputies of the 14th National Assembly of the French Fifth Republic